Clarissa Pinkola Estés (born January 27, 1945) is an American writer and Jungian psychoanalyst. She is the author of Women Who Run with the Wolves (1992), which remained on the New York Times bestseller list for 145 weeks and has sold over two million copies.

Life and career
Estés was born in Gary, Indiana, to Emilio Maria Reyés and Cepción Ixtiz, who were from Mexico.  She is a certified senior Jungian analyst. She earned her doctorate, from the Union Institute & University [1981], in ethno-clinical psychology on the study of social and psychological patterns in cultural and tribal groups. She is the author of many books on the journey of the soul. Beginning in 1992 and onward, her work has been published in 37 languages. Her book Women Who Run With the Wolves: Myths and Stories of The Wild Woman Archetype was on the New York Times''' best seller list for 145 weeks, as well as other best seller lists, including USA Today, Publishers Weekly, and Library Journal.

Estés began her work in the 1960s at the Edward Hines Jr. Veterans Administration Hospital in Hines, Illinois. There she worked with World War I, World War II, Korean and Vietnam War soldiers who were living with quadraplegia, incapacitated by loss of arms and legs. She has worked at other facilities caring for severely injured children as well as shell-shocked war veterans and their families. Her teaching of writing, storytelling and traditional medicine practices continued in prisons, beginning in the early 1970s at the Men's Penitentiary in Colorado; the Federal Women's Prison at Dublin, California; the Montview Facility for Youth in Colorado; and other institutions.

Estés served as a board member of the Maya Angelou Minority Health Foundation (now called Maya Angelou Center for Health Equity) at Wake Forest School of Medicine. Estés served as appointee by Colorado governors Romer and Owens to the Colorado State Grievance Board of the Department of Regulatory Agencies (D.O.R.A.) from 1993 to 2006. She was elected as chair and for thirteen years worked with the state of Colorado Attorney General's lawyers, as well as a board of legal experts and helping professionals, to focus on public safety regarding mental health practitioners. She has been an advisory board member for the National Writers Union, New York; and an advisory board member of the National Coalition Against Censorship, New York. She is an advisor to El Museo de las Americas, Denver, Colorado, and a contributing editor and storyteller-in-residence for The Bloomsbury Review.

Estés debuted in spoken word performance at Carnegie Hall, New York (2000), along with Maya Angelou and Toni Morrison. Together the author-poets wrote lyrical song-poems for a libretto of woman.life.song..

Estés is managing editor for TheModeratevoice.com. She has written for the Huffington Post, the Washington Post, Publishers' Weekly and The Denver Post. Estés' Guadalupe Foundation has funded literacy projects.

Estés was a recipient of the Keeper of the Lore Award, a Gradiva Award (from the National Association for the Advancement of Psychoanalysis), a Catholic Press Association award, the Book of the Year Honor Award, American Booksellers Association, and Colorado Authors League Award. She received the Las Primeras Award, "The First of Her Kind", from the Mexican American Women's Foundation, Washington D.C. She is a 2006 inductee into the Colorado Women's Hall of Fame which recognizes women who are of international influence. Estés is the recipient of the President's Medal for Social Justice.

Books
 Untie the Strong Woman: Blessed Mother's Immaculate Love for the Wild Soul (Sounds True Books, USA, 2011)
 Women Who Run With the Wolves: Myths and Stories of the Wild Woman Archetype (Ballantine, 1992/ 1995/1997, New York, USA)
 The Faithful Gardener: A Wise Tale About that Which Can Never Die (Harper, 1996, USA)
 The Gift of Story: A Wise Tale About What is Enough (Ballantine, 1993, USA)
 Tales of the Brothers Grimm; 50-page introduction by Estés (BMOC/QPB special edition, USA)
 Hero With A Thousand Faces, Joseph Campbell; 50-page introduction by Estés (Princeton University Press, 100th anniversary edition 2004, USA)

Audio works
 Untie the Strong Woman: To Know and Honor Holy Mother & La Nuestra Señora, Our Lady of Guadalupe (2011) (mp3s/CDs)
 How To Be An Elder: Myths and Stories of The Dangerous Old Woman, Volume 5 (2012) (mp3s/CDs)
 The Late Bloomer: Myths and Stories of The Dangerous Old Woman, Volume 4 (2011) (mp3s/CDs)
 The Joyous Body: Myths and Stories of The Dangerous Old Woman and the Consort Body, Volume 3 (2011) (mp3s/CDs)
 The Power of the Crone: Myths and Stories of The Dangerous Old Woman and Her Special Wisdom, Volume 2 (2010) (mp3s/CDs)
 The Dangerous Old Woman: Myths and Stories of the Wise Woman Archetype, Volume 1 (2010) (mp3s/CDs)
 Mother Night: Myths, Stories and Teachings for Learning to See in the Dark (2010) (mp3s/CDs)
 Seeing in the Dark: Myths and Stories to Reclaim the Buried, Knowing Woman (2010) (mp3s/CDs)
 Warming the Stone Child: Myths & Stories About Abandonment and the Unmothered Child (1997) (mp3s/CDs)
 The Radiant Coat: Myths & Stories About the Crossing Between Life and Death (1993) (mp3s/CDs)
 The Creative Fire: Myths and Stories About the Cycles of Creativity (1993) (mp3s/CDs)
 In the House of the Riddle Mother: The Most Common Archetypal Motifs in Women's Dreams (1997, 2005) (mp3s/CDs)
 Theatre of the Imagination: Volume I (1999, 2005) (mp3s/CDs)
 Theatre of the Imagination: Volume II (1999, 2005) (mp3s/CDs)
 The Red Shoes: On Torment and the Recovery of Soul Life (1997, 2005) (mp3s/CDs)
 Bedtime Stories: For Crossing the Threshold Between Waking and Sleep (2002) (mp3s/CDs)
 Beginner's Guide to Dream Analysis (2000) (mp3s/CDs)
 How To Love A Woman: Myths and Stories about Intimacy and The Erotic Lives of Women (1996) (mp3s/CDs)
 The Faithful Gardener: A Wise Tale About that Which Can Never Die (1996) (mp3s/CDs)
 The Boy Who Married An Eagle: Myths and Stories About Men's Interior Lives (1995) (audio cassette)
 The Gift of Story: A Wise Tale About What is Enough (1993) (mp3s/CDs)
 Women Who Run With the Wolves: Myths and Stories about the Wild Woman Archetype'' (1989 audio bestseller, released before the completed manuscript was in book form ) (mp3s/CDs)

References

External links

 Estés is the Managing Editor and a columnist at The Moderate Voice political-newsblog
 mavenproductions.com - Calendar of Estés' keynotes, seminars, professional trainings
 Her columns are archived at The National Catholic Reporter online 
 "Do Not Lose Heart, We Were Made for These Times: Letter to a Young Activist During Troubled Times" by Estés
 "Baptism: The Good Fathers" and "Internship: The Bad Fathers (poetry by Estés)
 "Slaughter of Innocence" by Estés in U.S. Catholic magazine.
 Blog Entry: "Don Imus And Bernard McGuirk re “Nappy-Headed Hos”" by Estés'	
 Archived Google Video of 2000 Charlie Rose Show about woman.life.song. performance/ production at Carnegie Hall featuring Clarissa Pinkola Estés, Jessye Norman, Judith Weir and Toni Morrison.

Pinkola Estes, Clarissa
Pinkola Estes, Clarissa
Pinkola Estes, Clarissa
Pinkola Estes, Clarissa
Pinkola Estes, Clarissa
Pinkola Estes, Clarissa
American women poets
20th-century American women writers
20th-century American poets
American women non-fiction writers
American writers of Mexican descent
People from Gary, Indiana
Writers from Gary, Indiana